Weekly Idol is a South Korean variety show, which airs Wednesdays at 7:30 PM KST on MBC M, and 12:00 AM KST on MBC Every1, MBC's cable and satellite networks. For its first season, the show was hosted by comedian Jeong Hyeong-don and rapper Defconn.

The second season, which debuted on April 11, 2018, was hosted by former Roo'ra member Lee Sang-min and comedians Yoo Se-yoon & Kim Shin-young.

The third season, which debuted on January 9, 2019, is hosted by comedians Jo Se-ho & Nam Chang-hee and ZE:A's Hwang Kwang-hee. On February 12, 2020, it was announced that Jo Se-ho and Nam Chang-hee will leave their hosting roles, and there will be special MCs recruited to join Hwang Kwang-hee in hosting each episode, starting from the episode on February 19 until the episode on April 15. On April 17, it was announced that Super Junior's Eunhyuk will join the fixed host line-up with Hwang Kwang-hee, starting from the episode on April 22.

2011

2012

2013

2014

2015

2016

2017

https://en.wikipedia.org/wiki/MJ_(South_Korean_singer)

2018

2019

2020

2021

2022

2023

Notes

References

External links 
 

 
Lists of variety television series episodes
Lists of South Korean television series episodes